George H. Roop (born November 10, 1981) is a retired mixed martial artist. He was a cast member of Spike TV's The Ultimate Fighter: Team Nogueira vs. Team Mir, winning his preliminary and first round fights. He fought as a bantamweight in the UFC and most recently fought under the Road FC banner. He holds notable victories over former WEC Bantamweight champion Brian Bowles and UFC featherweight contender Chan Sung Jung.

Background
Roop is from Tucson, Arizona and began competing in martial arts from a young age, winning Tae Kwon Do and judo tournaments while following the UFC in its early days. He later attended Canyon Del Oro High School, where he was a quarterback on the football team and participated in wrestling in the 112 lbs. division, and had also wrestled in middle school. He attended Pima Community College but elected not to wrestle. He met former UFC fighters Drew Fickett and Efrain Escudero while attending PCC.

Mixed martial arts
Roop developed his mixed martial skills at The Ultima Martial Arts and Primero Jiu-Jitsu in Tucson, Arizona. Roop's main experience comes from fighting in an Arizona-based promotion, Rage in the Cage, where he was the featherweight champion. He has fought as a lightweight, featherweight and bantamweight.

Roop was originally a fighter for the team, The Ultima Martial Arts. When the Ultimate Fighter ended, Roop moved out to Las Vegas, Nevada and began his training with Xtreme Couture. After Shawn Tompkins left Xtreme Couture, Roop followed him and started fighting for Team Tompkins. Now, he fights out of APEX MMA in Tucson, AZ.

The Ultimate Fighter
Roop defeated Rolando Delgado by decision in the preliminary round. This meant that he earned a shot in the TUF house. Roop was selected last overall in the team selections, by Team Mir. George's fight with John Polakowski was the last lightweight, first round fight. Right before the fight Roop broke his hand, during his team's practice. Roop won the fight by decision after two rounds. Frank Mir said it was the fight of the show. While Dana White stated "Sometimes fights that need a third round don't make it, even when they should."

In the semi-finals, Roop fought Phillipe Nover and lost in round one by submission.

Ultimate Fighting Championship
Roop lost his UFC debut against former The Ultimate Fighter: Team Nogueira vs. Team Mir castmate Shane Nelson. Roop lost the fight via split decision. Roop had his next fight at UFC 98: Evans vs. Machida where he defeated Dave Kaplan via split decision.

In his third UFC fight, Roop stepped in on very short notice to take on George Sotiropoulos at UFC 101. Roop lost the fight in the second round after Sotiropoulos applied a kimura forcing Roop to tap instantly. Roop was let go, along with Thales Leites and Tamdan McCrory, after going 1-2 in the promotion.

After release from the UFC
After being released from the Ultimate Fighting Championships, Roop returned to the Rage in the Cage promotion to fight Matt Dell for the featherweight title. The fight took place on November 14 with Roop winning all three rounds on every judges scorecard to capture the title.

World Extreme Cagefighting
Roop was signed by the WEC after going only 1-0 since being released from the UFC. He was set to make his debut against Jesse Moreng on January 10, 2010 at WEC 46, but Moreng was forced off the card with an injury.  Roop instead went down two weight classes to bantamweight and faced Eddie Wineland.  Wineland defeated Roop via unanimous decision.

Roop faced Leonard Garcia on March 6, 2010 at WEC 47 after he replaced Diego Nunes who was forced off the card with an injury. The bout ended in a rare split draw but earned Fight of the Night honors.

Roop next faced Chan Sung Jung on September 30, 2010 at WEC 51.  A significant underdog going into the fight, Roop won via KO due to a vicious head kick to the chin in the second round, earning him the Knockout of the Night bonus and giving Jung his first ever stoppage loss.

Return to Ultimate Fighting Championship
On October 28, 2010, World Extreme Cagefighting merged with the Ultimate Fighting Championship. As part of the merger, all WEC fighters were transferred to the UFC.

Roop fought former Team Tompkins teammate & training partner, Mark Hominick on January 22, 2011 at UFC: Fight For The Troops 2. Roop was knocked down multiple times and at just 1:28 of the first round Roop lost via TKO due to strikes.

Roop then faced Josh Grispi on June 4, 2011 at The Ultimate Fighter 13 Finale. Although the underdog, he dominated the fight and finished Grispi with a body shot for the TKO finish in the third round.

Roop faced world ranked Featherweight Hatsu Hioki on October 29, 2011 at UFC 137.  Roop lost via split decision.

Roop next faced Cub Swanson on January 28, 2012 at UFC on Fox: Evans vs. Davis. He lost the fight via TKO in the second round.

Roop was expected to face Antonio Carvalho on July 21, 2012 at UFC 149. However, Roop was forced out of the bout with an injury and replaced by Daniel Pineda.

Roop was expected to return to Bantamweight and face Yuri Alcantara on January 19, 2013 at UFC on FX: Belfort vs. Bisping, replacing an injured Johnny Eduardo. However, Roop was forced out of the bout with an injury and replaced by promotional newcomer Pedro Nobre.

In his next fight, Roop faced Reuben Duran on March 16, 2013 at UFC 158. He won the fight via unanimous decision.

Roop faced Brian Bowles on May 25, 2013 at UFC 160. He won the fight via TKO in the second round.

Roop was expected to face Francisco Rivera on October 19, 2013 at UFC 166.  However, the pairing was shifted to November 6, 2013 at UFC Fight Night 31. He lost the fight via TKO in the second round.

Roop faced Dustin Kimura on April 16, 2014 at The Ultimate Fighter Nations Finale. He won the fight via unanimous decision.

Roop faced promotional newcomer Rob Font on July 5, 2014 at UFC 175. He lost the fight via knockout in the first round.

Roop faced Takeya Mizugaki on September 27, 2015 at UFC Fight Night 75. He lost the fight by unanimous decision.

On February 9, 2016, Roop was released from the UFC

Road FC
Roop signed a multi-fight deal with Road FC on March 22, 2016 and made his debut in Road FC 031 on May 14, 2016.  During the fight Roop attempted to strike his opponent, Yoon Jun Lee, with a front kick and suffered a broken leg resulting in a TKO loss.

Personal life
Roop is the father of 6 children. The eldest child, Julian died in 2009 at the age of seven. 

During his long tenure under Zuffa promotions, he reinvested his salaries into licenses for growing medical cannabis and creating a cannabis production facility in his native Tucson.

Championships and accomplishments
World Extreme Cagefighting
Fight of the Night (One time) vs. Leonard Garcia 
Knockout of the Night (One time) vs. Chan Sung Jung

Mixed martial arts record

|-
|Loss
| align=center|15–13–1 
| Yoon Jun Lee
| TKO (broken leg)
| Road FC 31
| 
|align=center|1
|align=center|1:15
| Seoul, South Korea
|
|-
|Loss
| align=center|15–12–1 
| Takeya Mizugaki
| Decision (unanimous)
| UFC Fight Night: Barnett vs. Nelson
| 
|align=center|3
|align=center|5:00
| Saitama, Japan
|
|-
| Loss
|align=center|15–11–1
| Rob Font
| KO (punch)
| UFC 175
| 
|align=center|1
|align=center|2:19
| Las Vegas, Nevada, United States
|
|-
| Win
|align=center|15–10–1
| Dustin Kimura
| Decision (unanimous)
| The Ultimate Fighter Nations Finale: Bisping vs. Kennedy
| 
|align=center|3
|align=center|5:00
| Quebec City, Quebec, Canada
|
|-
| Loss
|align=center|
| Francisco Rivera
| TKO (punches)
| UFC: Fight for the Troops 3
| 
|align=center|2
|align=center|2:20
| Fort Campbell, Kentucky, United States
|
|-
| Win
|align=center|14–9–1
| Brian Bowles
| TKO (punches)
| UFC 160
| 
|align=center|2
|align=center|1:43
| Las Vegas, Nevada, United States
|
|-
| Win
|align=center|13–9–1
| Reuben Duran
| Decision (unanimous)
| UFC 158
| 
|align=center|3
|align=center|5:00
| Montreal, Quebec, Canada
|
|-
| Loss
|align=center|12–9–1
| Cub Swanson
| TKO (punches)
| UFC on Fox: Evans vs. Davis
| 
|align=center|2
|align=center|2:22
| Chicago, Illinois, United States
|
|-
| Loss
|align=center| 12–8–1
| Hatsu Hioki
| Decision (split)
| UFC 137
| 
|align=center| 3
|align=center| 5:00
|Las Vegas, Nevada, United States
| 
|-
| Win
|align=center| 12–7–1
| Josh Grispi
| TKO (body punch)
| The Ultimate Fighter: Team Lesnar vs. Team dos Santos Finale
| 
|align=center| 3
|align=center| 3:14
|Las Vegas, Nevada, United States
| 
|-
| Loss
|align=center| 11–7–1
| Mark Hominick
| TKO (punches)
| UFC: Fight for the Troops 2
| 
|align=center| 1
|align=center| 1:28
|Fort Hood, Texas, United States
|
|-
| Win
|align=center| 11–6–1
| Chan Sung Jung
| KO (head kick)
| WEC 51
| 
|align=center| 2
|align=center| 1:30
|Broomfield, Colorado, United States
| 
|-
| Draw
|align=center| 10–6–1
| Leonard Garcia
| Draw (split)
| WEC 47
| 
|align=center| 3
|align=center| 5:00
|Columbus, Ohio, United States
| 
|-
| Loss
|align=center| 10–6
| Eddie Wineland
| Decision (unanimous)
| WEC 46
| 
|align=center| 3
|align=center| 5:00
|Sacramento, California, United States
| 
|-
| Win
|align=center| 10–5
| Matt Dell
| Decision (unanimous)
| Rage in the Cage 137
| 
|align=center| 3
|align=center| 5:00
|Tucson, Arizona, United States
| 
|-
| Loss
|align=center| 9–5
| George Sotiropoulos
| Submission (kimura)
| UFC 101
| 
|align=center| 2
|align=center| 1:59
|Philadelphia, Pennsylvania, United States
| 
|-
| Win
|align=center| 9–4
| Dave Kaplan
| Decision (split)
| UFC 98
| 
|align=center| 3
|align=center| 5:00
|Las Vegas, Nevada, United States
| 
|-
| Loss
|align=center| 8–4
| Shane Nelson
| Decision (split)
| The Ultimate Fighter: Team Nogueira vs. Team Mir Finale
| 
|align=center| 3
|align=center| 5:00
|Las Vegas, Nevada, United States
| 
|-
| Win
|align=center| 8–3
| Nick Buschman
| TKO (punches)
| WFC: Armageddon
| 
|align=center| 1
|align=center| 0:24
|Denver, Colorado, United States
| 
|-
| Win
|align=center| 7–3
| Tito Jones
| Decision (unanimous)
| Rage in the Cage 101
| 
|align=center| 3
|align=center| 3:00
|Fountain Hills, Arizona, United States
| 
|-
| Win
|align=center| 6–3
| Andrew Belvado
| Submission (rear-naked choke)
| Cage Supremacy 2
| 
|align=center| 1
|align=center| 1:01
|Tucson, Arizona, United States
| 
|-
| Loss
|align=center| 5–3
| Austin Pascucci
| Submission (armbar)
| Rage in the Cage 96
| 
|align=center| 1
|align=center| 2:08
|Tucson, Arizona, United States
| 
|-
| Loss
|align=center| 5–2
| Ray Robinson
| Submission (armbar)
| Rage in the Cage 93
| 
|align=center| 1
|align=center| 2:29
|Phoenix, Arizona, United States
| 
|-
| Win
|align=center| 5–1
| Matt Dell
| Decision (split)
| Rage in the Cage 91
| 
|align=center| 3
|align=center| 3:00
|Phoenix, Arizona, United States
| 
|-
| Win
|align=center| 4–1
| Carlos Ortega
| Decision (unanimous)
| Rage in the Cage 88
| 
|align=center| 3
|align=center| 3:00
|Tucson, Arizona, United States
| 
|-
| Win
|align=center| 3–1
| Louie Rosa
| Submission (punches)
| Rage in the Cage 86
| 
|align=center| 2
|align=center| 2:15
|San Carlos, Arizona, United States
| 
|-
| Loss
|align=center| 2–1
| Nick Hedrick
| Submission (guillotine choke)
| Rage in the Cage 85
| 
|align=center| 1
|align=center| 1:42
|Phoenix, Arizona, United States
| 
|-
| Win
|align=center| 2–0
| Jason Sterling
| Submission (rear-naked choke)
| Rage in the Cage 84
| 
|align=center| 1
|align=center| 0:37
|Phoenix, Arizona, United States
| 
|-
| Win
|align=center| 1–0
| Austin Pascucci
| Submission (armbar)
| Rage in the Cage 82
| 
|align=center| 2
|align=center| 2:42
|Tucson, Arizona, United States
|

See also
 List of current UFC fighters
 List of male mixed martial artists

References

External links
 UFC Profile
 

1981 births
Living people
American male mixed martial artists
Mixed martial artists from Arizona
Sportspeople from Tucson, Arizona
People from Pima County, Arizona
Lightweight mixed martial artists
Featherweight mixed martial artists
Bantamweight mixed martial artists
Mixed martial artists utilizing taekwondo
Mixed martial artists utilizing judo
Mixed martial artists utilizing wrestling
Ultimate Fighting Championship male fighters
American male taekwondo practitioners
American male judoka